Wade Township is one of eleven townships in Jasper County, Illinois, USA.  As of the 2010 census, its population was 4,475 and it contained 2,082 housing units.

Geography

Cities, towns, villages
 Newton

Unincorporated towns
 Falmouth at 
 Lis at 
(This list is based on USGS data and may include former settlements.)

Adjacent townships
 Crooked Creek Township (northeast)
 Hunt City Township (east)
 Willow Hill Township (east)
 Fox Township (southeast)
 Smallwood Township (south)
 South Muddy Township (southwest)
 North Muddy Township (west)
 Grove Township (northwest)

Cemeteries
The township contains these twenty-two cemeteries: Bowers, Brick, Burford, Carter, Christian Chapel, Coburn, Gila Lutheran, Higgins/Colburn, Hickory, Jasper Family, Jones, Kibler, Liberty, Miller/Yager, Mt Calvery, New Saint Peters, Old Jasper County Poor Farm, Old Saint Peters, Redford, Riverside, Vanderhoof and West Lawn.

Major highways
  Illinois Route 33
  Illinois Route 130

Airports and landing strips
 Jasper County Safety Council Heliport

Rivers
 Embarras River

Lakes
 Glen Lake

Landmarks
 Sam Parr State Fish and Wildlife Area

Demographics

School districts
 Jasper County Community Unit School District 1

Political districts
 Illinois's 19th congressional district
 State House District 108
 State Senate District 54

References
 
 United States Census Bureau 2007 TIGER/Line Shapefiles
 United States National Atlas

External links
 City-Data.com
 Illinois State Archives

Townships in Jasper County, Illinois
1859 establishments in Illinois
Populated places established in 1859
Townships in Illinois